"Who Knew" is a 2006 song by Pink.

Who Knew may also refer to:

Who Knew?, a 2010 album by Keke Wyatt
"Who Knew", a song by Eminem from The Marshall Mathers LP
"Who Knew", a song by Major Lazer
"Who Knew?", a Season 11 episode of M*A*S*H